Vernon E. Scoville III (August 17, 1953 – April 4, 2022) was an American politician and judge.

Scoville was born in Kansas City, Missouri, and graduated from Ruskin High School in Kansas City, in 1971. He served in the United States Army during the Vietnam War. Scoville received his Juris Doctor degree from University of Missouri–Kansas City School of Law. Scoville was elected to the Missouri House of Representatives in 1982, and served until October 1991, when he resigned to become an associate judge for the Missouri Circuit Court of Jackson County. He stepped down as a judge in 2013. He died at his home in Blue Springs, Missouri.

References

1953 births
2022 deaths
Lawyers from Kansas City, Missouri
Politicians from Kansas City, Missouri
People from Blue Springs, Missouri
Military personnel from Missouri
University of Missouri–Kansas City alumni
Missouri state court judges
Members of the Missouri House of Representatives